Tricorythidae is a family of mayflies in the order Ephemeroptera. There are about six genera and at least 40 described species in Tricorythidae.

Genera
These six genera belong to the family Tricorythidae:
 Madecassorythus Elouard & Oliarinony, 1997
 Ranorythus Oliarinony & Elouard, 1997
 Sparsorythus Sroka & Soldán, 2008
 Spinirythus Oliarinony & Elouard, 1998
 Tricorythis
 Tricorythus Eaton, 1868

References

Further reading

 
 
 
 

Mayflies
Insect families
Articles created by Qbugbot